Savoy is a city in Fannin County, Texas, United States. The population was 831 at the 2010 census.

Geography

Savoy is located in western Fannin County at  (33.601262, –96.363793). Its western border is the Grayson County line. Texas State Highway 56 passes through the city, leading east  to Bonham, the Fannin County seat, and west  to Bells.

Demographics

2020 census

As of the 2020 United States census, there were 712 people, 303 households, and 231 families residing in the city.

2000 census
As of the census of 2000, there were 850 people, 305 households, and 214 families residing in the city. The population density was 1,176.0 people per square mile (455.8/km). There were 350 housing units at an average density of 484.2 per square mile (187.7/km). The racial makeup of the city was 94.94% White, 0.47% African American, 0.71% Native American, 0.35% Asian, 1.53% from other races, and 2.00% from two or more races. Hispanic or Latino of any race were 2.59% of the population.

There were 305 households, out of which 33.4% had children under the age of 18 living with them, 58.0% were married couples living together, 10.5% had a female householder with no husband present, and 29.8% were non-families. 26.2% of all households were made up of individuals, and 12.5% had someone living alone who was 65 years of age or older. The average household size was 2.47 and the average family size was 3.00.

In the city, the population was spread out, with 23.6% under the age of 18, 6.6% from 18 to 24, 23.8% from 25 to 44, 21.3% from 45 to 64, and 24.7% who were 65 years of age or older. The median age was 42 years. For every 100 females, there were 86.0 males. For every 100 females age 18 and over, there were 77.8 males.

The median income for a household in the city was $37,679, and the median income for a family was $41,641. Males had a median income of $31,528 versus $22,188 for females. The per capita income for the city was $16,448. About 4.3% of families and 8.6% of the population were below the poverty line, including 6.9% of those under age 18 and 12.5% of those age 65 or over.

Education
Savoy is served by the Savoy Independent School District.

Notable people
 Harold Joe Waldrum, artist
 Ted Wright, NFL player

References

External links
City of Savoy official website

Cities in Fannin County, Texas
Cities in Texas